Metty Scheitler (1 August 1915 – 10 September 1972) was a Luxembourgian wrestler. He competed at the 1936 Summer Olympics and the 1952 Summer Olympics.

References

1915 births
1972 deaths
Luxembourgian male sport wrestlers
Olympic wrestlers of Luxembourg
Wrestlers at the 1936 Summer Olympics
Wrestlers at the 1952 Summer Olympics
Sportspeople from Esch-sur-Alzette